The 1992–93 Primera División de Fútbol Profesional season is the 41st tournament of El Salvador's Primera División since its establishment of the National League system in 1948. The tournament was scheduled to end in, 1993. Luis Angel Firpo, the best regular season team, won the championship match against Alianza FC.

Teams

Managerial changes

During the season

Final

Top scorers

List of foreign players in the league
This is a list of foreign players in 1992-1993. The following players:
have played at least one  game for the respective club.
have not been capped for the El Salvador national football team on any level, independently from the birthplace

ADET
 

C.D. Águila
 

Alianza F.C.
  Marcelo Bauza

Atletico Marte
  Oscar Tedini
  Alvery Rodrígues Dos Santos
  Rodinei Martins 
  Agustin Castillo

Apaneca
 

 (player released mid season)
  (player Injured mid season)
 Injury replacement player

Cojutepeque
 

C.D. FAS
  Carlos Seixa
  Ruben Baeque
  Luis Enrique Guelmo
  Mauricio Silvera

C.D. Luis Ángel Firpo
  Celio Rodriguez

Fuerte San Francisco
 

Tiburones

External links
 
 
 

1991